The Alarcón Dam (Spanish: Presa de Alarcón, Pantano de Alarcón, or Embalse de Alarcón) is a gravity dam on the upper course of the Júcar River.

All together, its drainage basin measures 3,033 km2 (1,171 mi2). The dam houses a hydroelectric power plant with an installed power capacity of 56 MW.

The Tagus-Segura Water Transfer, which links two other major rivers, joins the reservoir briefly on its journey south, entering at the northern tail end and mixing its waters with the Júcar.

Construction of the dam began in 1941 through the efforts of Valencian farmers who wanted to stabilize the flow of the river, as irrigation in the province of Valencia depends on that supply of water.

Beneath the waters of the Alarcón Reservoir rest the remains of the town of Gascas, which was flooded after the building of the dam. When the water level drops, one can see traces of the streets and walls, as well as a stone wall with an arch.

The reservoir is located within the municipal districts of the following towns (from east to west): Alarcón, Olmedilla de Alarcón, Tébar, Cañada Juncosa, Buenache de Alarcón, Honrubia, Torrubia del Castillo, Hontecillas, Valverde de Júcar, Castillo de Garcimuñoz, Villaverde y Pasaconsol, La Almarcha, Belmontejo, and Olivares de Júcar.

References

Dams in Spain
Hydroelectric power stations in Spain
Gravity dams
1955 establishments in Spain
Dams completed in 1955
Buildings and structures in the Province of Cuenca
Energy infrastructure completed in 1955
Reservoirs in Castilla–La Mancha
Energy in Castilla–La Mancha